Willughbeia cirrhifera is a species of plant in the family Apocynaceae. It is endemic to Sri Lanka.

References

cirrhifera
Flora of Sri Lanka
Vulnerable plants
Taxonomy articles created by Polbot